Guang-Yu Guo from the National Taiwan University, was awarded the status of Fellow in the American Physical Society, after they were nominated by their Division of Computational Physics in 2005, for his contributions to our understanding of relativity-induced phenomena in magnetic solids and physical properties of materials including transition metal oxides and carbon nanotube structures, through first-principles electronic structure calculations.

References 

Fellows of the American Physical Society
21st-century Taiwanese physicists
Living people
Date of death missing
Year of birth missing (living people)